In and Out, In & Out, or In 'n Out may refer to:

Music
In-n-Out Records, a Japanese record label

Albums
 In 'n Out, a 1964 album by Joe Henderson
 In and Out (album), a 2009 album by James Blood Ulmer

Songs
"In and Out" (Willie Hutch song), 1982
"In & Out" (Marcus Canty song), 2012
"In and Out", a song by Beth Ditto from Fake Sugar
"In and Out", a song by Keith Sweat from Rebirth
"In and Out", a song by Moev from Head Down
"In and Out", a song by Scarface from The Last of a Dying Breed
"In and Out", a song by Screaming Jets from World Gone Crazy
"In and Out", a song by Speedway from Save Yourself
"In and Out", a song by Wes Montgomery from Movin' Wes
"In 'n' Out", a song by Van Halen from For Unlawful Carnal Knowledge
"In & Out", a 2000 song by Crispy

Film
In & Out (festival), gay and lesbian film festival in Nice, France
In and Out (1914 film), a short film
In and Out (1989 film), an animated short film by Alison Snowden and David Fine
In & Out (film), a 1997 comedy film starring Kevin Kline

Other uses
 Naval and Military Club in London, nicknamed "The In & Out"
In-N-Out Burger, an American fast-food restaurant chain
In and Out scandal, a 2006 Canadian political scandal

See also
In Out, a British food and drink magazine
''The In Out, an indie rock band from Boston, MA